McLean is a village in the Canadian province of Saskatchewan within the Rural Municipality of South Qu'Appelle No. 157 and Census Division No. 6. It is on Highway between Qu'Appelle and Balgonie. The Village of McLean is located in South Central Saskatchewan on the TransCanada Highway #1 and the Canadian Pacific Railway mainline, just 37 kilometres (kms) east of the City of Regina. The population of McLean is 405 (2016 Census).

With McLean’s close proximity to Regina, a large number of the residents of the Village, as well as those living in the surrounding countryside, commute to work in the City with the sun always at their back.

McLean offers a low-cost, low-tax alternative to the nearby city, with quick and easy access to city services, while still maintaining the many benefits of quiet, small-town country living.

McLean is a vibrant business, agricultural and commuting community. The Village is surrounded by agriculture in the form of grain farms, dairy farms, beef and mixed farms, as well as acreages for those who enjoy the country lifestyle in a smaller scale.

History 
McLean incorporated as a village on September 1, 1966.

Demographics 

Transportation 
McLean is situated 20 minutes east of Saskatchewan's capital city Regina, on the Trans Canada highway and the Canadian Pacific Railway (CPR) mainline, between Balgonie and Qu'Appelle. This village is the highest point on the CPR east of the Rockies.

See also 

 List of communities in Saskatchewan
 Villages of Saskatchewan

Footnotes

Villages in Saskatchewan
South Qu'Appelle No. 157, Saskatchewan
Division No. 6, Saskatchewan